Ou River may refer to:

Ou River, Laos
Ou River (Zhejiang) (or Oujiang), China